Nikolay Dmitriyevich Kashkin (15 March 1920) was a Russian music critic as well as a professor of piano and music theory at the Moscow Conservatory for 33 years (1866-96 and 1905-08).  

The son of a Voronezh bookseller, Kashkin was a self-taught musician who had started giving piano lessons by the time he was 13 years old.  In 1860 he travelled to Moscow for further study in piano with Alexandre Dubuque.  There he met Herman Laroche, Nikolai Rubinstein and Pyotr Ilyich Tchaikovsky.

He contributed music criticism primarily to the Russian Register (Русские ведомости) and the Moscow Register (Московские ведомости), sometimes under the pseudonym "Nikolai Dmitriev" (Николай Дмитриев). As a critic, Kashkin would do valuable service in the promotion of Tchaikovsky's music.  It was he who provided the epithet "Little Russian" for Tchaikovsky's Second Symphony. Tchaikovsky dedicated the song "Not a Word, O My Friend", Op. 6, No. 2 (1869) to him.

Kashkin published his recollections of Tchaikovsky three years after the composer's death.

References
Brown, David, Tchaikovsky: The Early Years, 1840-1874 (New York: W. W. Norton & Company, Inc., 1978)

Notes

1839 births
1920 deaths
Russian music critics
Russian music educators
Piano pedagogues
Pyotr Ilyich Tchaikovsky